The XI 2016 Oceania Badminton Championships were held as two events in different counties. From 16 to 21 February, the team event was held in Auckland, New Zealand. From 25 to 28 April, the individual event was held in Papeete, Tahiti.

Venue
X-TRM North Harbour Badminton Centre in Auckland, New Zealand for the team event, and Punaauia University Hall, within the University of French Polynesia in Papeete, Tahiti for the individual event.

Medalists

Team event
In the mixed team event, Australia national badminton team won the gold medal after topped the standings in the round roubin stage. Australia also won the gold medal for the women's team event, while New Zealand won the gold medal in the men's team event.

Individual event
The table below gives an overview of the individual event medal winners at the 2016 Oceania Championships.

References

External links
 Badminton Oceania
 Mixed Team Event
 Men's & Women's Team Event
 Individual Event

Oceania Badminton Championships
Oceania Badminton Championships
Oceania Badminton Championships
Oceania Badminton Championships
International sports competitions hosted by New Zealand
International sports competitions hosted by Tahiti
February 2016 sports events in New Zealand
April 2016 sports events in Oceania